Falkirk Ladies Football Club are a Scottish women's football club from the town of Falkirk. They play in the Scottish Women's Football League and also compete in the Women's First Division League Cup and Scottish Cup. They are not to be confused with the women's section of Falkirk F.C.

History
Falkirk Ladies were formed in 1993 as Falkirk Girls, when a group of women looking to play organised football joined forces with a girls-only coaching group from Falkirk FC. The club currently run age-group teams from U–11 through to U–17. The Senior Ladies side are based at Westfield Park in Denny, home of Dunipace Juniors.

In the 2018 season they will compete in the SWFL North division.

References

Women's football clubs in Scotland
Association football clubs established in 1993
Sport in Falkirk
1993 establishments in Scotland
Scottish Women's Football League clubs